Scratch Ankle is an unincorporated community in Monroe County, Alabama, United States, located  northwest of Monroeville.

History
Scratch Ankle got its name from the fact that locals were often seen by railroad workers scratching their ankles due to excessive mosquito bites. It has been frequently noted on lists of unusual place names.

References

Unincorporated communities in Monroe County, Alabama
Unincorporated communities in Alabama